Auliekol may refer to:

Auliekol, a village in Kostanay Region
Auliekol District, Kostanay Region
Auliekol (lake), a lake in Pavlodar Region
Auliekol, another name for Lake Burabay, Akmola Region